Mount Song ("lofty mountain") is an isolated mountain range in north central China's Henan Province, along the southern bank of the Yellow River. It is known in literary and folk tradition as the central mountain of the Five Great Mountains of China. Since at least as early as the early 1st millennium, Chinese astronomical mythology had acquired the idea that Mount Song is "the centre of Heaven and Earth." It was respected as such by the successive dynasties of the Chinese Empire.

Songshan National Scenic Spot is named after it. It is located at the coordinates shown for the article. On its upper slopes is the Sanhuangzhai Scenic Spot, further west seen from Route G1516 (Yanluo Expressway), which skirts the range on the south. The location is across the Shaoyang valley on the west side of which is Shaolin Monastery. The valley is well populated, in contrast to the forested and precipitous mountains.

The literature associated with this monastery, or "temple" (si) relates two folk-names of the range still in popular use due to their legendary status: Shaoshi Mountain, meaning all peaks west of the valley, and Taishi Mountain, all peaks east of the valley. Mount Song thus appears to be a two-peak range when actually there are as many as the counter cares to count. The possible number depends on the counter's minimum allowed prominence. PeakVisor, which records reported peaks in a given area, has recorded 44 for Denfeng, the lowest elevation being .

The Internet reports widely that Mount Song comprises 72 peaks, sometimes rounded off to 70. This  is a mystical figure taken from the cosmology of the Chan Buddhists. In their ancient myth, Shaoshi and Taishi each have 36 peaks, one set of Yin and one set of Yang, which cancel each other out at the monastery, achieving a zero sum (of what remains speculative). The numbers are not based on counting.

The etymology is equally obscure. Due to the antiquity the meaning of "Shao," "Tai," and "shi"  in this context is uncertain now. The few speculations attempt to connect the mountain name, Shao shi, with  an epithet of the temple, Shao lin si, but there is no linguistically credible connection.

Geography

The Qin-Huai Line
The Yellow River (Huang He) is the second-largest of China, the first being the Yangtze, which reaches to the east into Tibet (as does the Yellow). Its numerous tributaries on the way to the East China Sea just above Shanghai water a broad  swathe called the Yangtze Delta. Its low-altitude matrix of streams supports the great mass of Chinese people, the most numerous on Earth.

The Yellow River creates a second swathe just north of the Yangtze Delta. It is sometimes said to be in the Delta, but the Yangtze Valley and the Yellow River Valley, both running roughly E-W, are separated from each other by a divide. If it should be breached at any point then one river would capture the other upstream from the breach. Instead they are totally distinct.

Lowland visitors run the risk of altitude sickness. The shallow lake collects muddy waters from the surrounding grassy plateau made of thick deposits of loess, a fine dust deposited by glacial winds in the remote past. Suspended loess stays in the water, imparting to the river the yellow color after which it is named. Deposition of this dust fills up the riverbed, resulting in course changes and extensive flooding. Frequent dams and reservoirs help control this formerly disastrous problem.

The upper divide is the Qinling Range, a series of ridges trending roughly W-E, more exactly ESE, to the vicinity of Mount Song, which is considered to be in the range. Some consider Mount Song to be in the Funiu Mountains, another subrange of the Qinling, strictly speaking to the south of Mount Song. The line enters the Yangtze River Valley at Nanyang, . The distance across the divide on that line is therefore . Songshan is on the northern slope of the divide, its south edge being higher than the north. The monastic communities are on its south slopes.

East of Mount Song the divide is not as severe. Its lower course is totally controlled in long straight lines; in fact, very little of the topography there is natural. The median line of the divide is thus called the Qin-Huai Line, which has more than a geographical significance. As it turns out, the divide is a climate barrier. North of it the climate is temperate and dry; south, subtropical and wet. The two regions have been dubbed "North China" and "South China." Songshan has the North China climate.

The Songshan range
The landform (or geoform) that is referenced as Mount Song, or on which Mount Song is defined arbitrarily to be, is a range of irregular shape, more E-W than N-S, generally not located any more precisely than "between the cities of Luoyang and Zhengzhou," or "in Dengfeng 登封 district (Henan), not far from Luoyang." Except for a few islands on the west, the whole landform is prominent and continuous. The professionals - geographers, geologists, archaeologists - refer to the whole thing in English as "the Songshan Mountains." The width varies considerably. Since the global geopark covers the entire area, its estimated area may be taken as the range's area; that is, .

The eastern, or "Taishi" part of the landform extends from the valley to the outskirts of metropolitan Zhengzhou, say to Highway G3001. An axis connecting the two points would head NE and be . A perpendicular axis running from a point on Route S85 to the south to the Yellow River would be . The western, or "Shaoshi" part of the landform, is geomorphologically different. The western extension has another name, Wan'anshan, which is considered a branch of Songshan.

Eastern Mount Song is on the right bank of the Yellow River, but not western. At about  the Yellow River merges with a right-bank tributary, the Yi Luo. At about  the Yi he ("Yi River") to the south and the Luo he ("Luo River") join to form the Yi Luo he. Western Songshan is on the continuous right bank of the Yi and Yiluo, but not directly. A plain separates them through which the streams from Wan'anshan pass in their northward courses.

An observer at the confluence of the Yi and the Luo looking south to the Wan'anshan would perceive its general prominence over the plain. The slope of the plain would be 130/16 m/km or 0.8125%, scarcely different from flat. Once agricultural, the land is suburban Luoyang today.

Natural and cultural assets of the range and its vicinity

Geological
Three major orogenies formed the area: The Songyang orogeny of 2.5 billion years ago, the Zhongyue orogeny of 1.85 billion years ago, and the Shaolin orogeny of 570 million years ago. They were named after local attractions in the area. The Songshan Geopark is also called “a textbook of geological history”.

Mountaineering
The high points of the range form a u-shaped divide between the Yellow-River system draining to the NE and the Huai-River system draining to the SE. The concave side of the u faces south. Around it is a half-ring of high-altitude, high-prominence mountains, "sacred" to the ancient religions of China, which were Taoism and Buddhism. Within the u is the Shaoyang Valley, now part of metropolitan Denfeng, which conducts its daily business, so to speak, in the shadow of the mountains. It contains the remains and reconstructions of the ancient religious buildings, once a revolutionary target of the Chinese Communist Party, now supported by them as the basis of hugely profitable geotourism, geosports and geotheatre industries as well as vacation spot for the working people.

Ecological

Cultural

Archaeological

Development of the park

The first tourist areas
The founders of the Republic; i.e., the Nationalist Party, developed a dichotomous policy toward heritage culture. On the one hand it was to be rejected and attacked as "backward." On the other hand, the "movable relics and archaeological sites" were to be proffered as symbols to "strengthen the national identity". This duality led to somewhat arbitrary decisions on what to destroy and what to cherish. Buildings were especially vulnerable. The Shaolin Temple was attacked and conflagrated in 1928 by Shi Yousan, a warlord of the Warlord Era of the revolution, along with many others. Monks everywhere were at risk. On the other hand, a number of new, western-style museums were constructed to house the revered artifacts.

It was during the Republic's sojourn on the mainland that tourism and the designation of public parks began. The concept of a park is very ancient universally (witness the Persian paradeisos), but in China only the upper classes had them. The notion that land could belong to the people or that the people had the right to enjoy themselves there was subversive. The land belonged to a class dubbed "landlords" by the people. Whether the revolution was Nationalist or Communist, the chief target of popular spite was that very class. They were soon answering for their misdeeds in courts of the very people they had ruled, with typically fatal consequences. Their land became the people's property.

The western idea of a tourist agency that would book visits to scenic areas soon sparked a revolutionary counterpart in China. The China Travel Service was founded by Cheng Guanfu in 1927 under the authority of the Republic at the height of its anti-tradition phase. Its purpose was to take the travel business out of the hands of foreigners and provide the Chinese people with a native tourism. The sites to be visited were taken from The Encyclopedia of Chinese Scenic Spots and Ancient Relics of 1922. This agency unwittingly acquired a power not given to western agencies: the power to decide what is a scenic spot and what a relic. Travel to one was not possible without government permission and it was the agency that passed it on. After the communists received this agency they made it a branch of the government. By 1940 they had designated 15 areas for public visitation, the core of the later scenic areas.

Setbacks under Chairman Mao
In 1949 the People's Republic of China began under the leadership of Chairman Mao Zedong of the Chinese Communist Party. His party had defeated the forces of the Republic of China (1912-1949), successor to the Chinese Empire, in the Chinese Communist Revolution, forcing them to move their republic the Island of Taiwan. As the United States had aided and abetted the Republic, it became the antagonist of the People's Republic in the succeeding Cold War.

The communists collectivized Chinese economic undertakings, dividing the workers into work units, or collectives, on the Soviet model. In the chairman's view, tourism was unnecessary, and so therefore were tourist sites. "Heritage sites" had no value as such and were converted to other purposes. Similarly ancient artifacts were destroyed as well, except for a select few chosen as national symbols.

The anti-tradition side of the dichotomy was not unmitigated. The CPC attempted many times to draw up lists of buildings to be protected or to pass regulations defending heritage sites; however, higher-priority needs always seemed to nullify them. Of especially high priority was Mao's policy of the Great Leap Forward, with which he hoped to transform China into a modern state. To the contrary, the leap was too far, too fast. The demands made upon the workers far exceeded their ability to comply. The punishments brought into play for not meeting deadlines amounted to a terror. Economic collapse and social anarchy began. A famine ensued, increasing the death toll of this already sanguinary revolution greatly.

It was at this point that Mao made his greatest misjudgements, which, had he not died, would surely have led to his overthrow. He concluded that failure to meet deadlines was an act of sabotage conducted by secret capitalist enemies of the communist state, including party members. Hence began the 10-year cultural revolution, the worst terror of all. Recruiting the Red Guards from the youth, Mao set them against tradition and the more established members of the party. In essence they had the power to kill or destroy anyone or anything they pleased. A great many antiquities were lost. Mao is said to have had some ancient tombs filled with concrete.

On Mao's death in 1976 the chairmanship was assumed by his vice-chairman, Hua Guofeng, who stopped the cultural revolution by arresting Mao's co-conspirators, the Gang of Four. He wanted to return to Mao's previous planned economy implemented by collectives, but the Party and the people had had enough Maoism. In 1978 the Central Committee made Deng Xiaoping paramount leader. He had been sidelined by Mao for his opposition to the Cultural Revolution but now he was rehabilitated to establish a market economy. In essence the revolution was over.

Deng's main concern was the Constitution of the People's Republic of China. There was one in 1954, another is 1976, and Deng promulgated a third in 1978 with the full support of the Party. There would be another in 1982, and five revisions after. The 1978 and 1982 constitutions normalized the government, and emphasized personal rights and freedom, but the CPC remained in power and was the only party allowed. Ironically the Red Guard was instructed to save and protect the very antiquities they had been created to destroy, too late for a large part of them.

Songshan protected area
The People's Republic changed course, which was formally sanctified in 1982 with the Law on the Protection of Cultural Heritage of the People's Republic of China, the title of which says it all. The internal collapse of the Soviet Union in 1991 brought a swift end to the cold war. The borders of the People's Republic were opened. The Chinese people everywhere began to express a spontaneous and passionate interest in preserving the cultural and natural heritage of China and making it available to the rest of the world. In parallel to other countries they began to establish parks, which were brought under the umbrella of "protected areas (PA's)." This category was adopted in China by the Ministry of Environmental Protection in 1994 as part of its first Biodiversity Action Plan after China's becoming signatory in the United Nations' Convention on Biological Diversity. The plan currently in effect is the second, adopted 2010: The National Biodiversity Conservation Strategy and Action Plan (2011-2030). It is being supplemented by an increasing number of county plans. By 2018 there were more than 11,800 PA's in China of 17 different types. Tourism increased in record proportions. For example, in 2017 some 826 million tourists visited 3505 PA's of a type called "Forest Park."

Songshan scenic area
However some of the types were already in existence before the end of the Cold War. The scenic area is a case in point. It is a park protecting scenic views, but open to tourism and some minor changes in support of it, such as a cable car. Having begun under the Republic in the 1920s, scenic areas increased but slowly under provincial dominion during the troubled years of the civil war. Mao maintained them but did not improve them. Under the law of 1982 the government organized the scenic areas into provincial or province-level and national or state-level (ratified by the State Council), the latter being an upgrade of the former. A national scenic area (in translation a national park, though bona fide national parks came later) was held to stricter standards, not meeting which would cause the park to drop to a provincial. Currently IUCN standards II, III, and V apply.

At the time there were to be 44 scenic areas, each containing one or more scenic spots, or scenic places within scenic areas. Songshan was placed in the national category. In 1986 it received a Master Plan formulated by Tongji University, which was ratified in 1990 by the State Council of the People's Republic of China. Shaolin Monastery was featured as a scenic spot. Funds were allocated to restore it (It had burned down in 1928). Other scenic spots are Songyang Academy, Zhongyue Temple, Star Observatory, Daxiongshan Xianren Valley, Fanjia Gate, and Zhaixing Tower. This scenic area was not the whole range. Shaped like  bean, its concave side faces the south. Shaoshi and Taishi are the masses on the side, as far as they go. The valley is not included, as it was already urban Dengfeng.

Songshan forest area
In 1982 along with the scenic areas the State Council ratified a new type of PA, the Forest park or area, devised by the State Planning Commission (subsequent National Development and Reform Commission), also dividing such parks into provincial and national, with a third type, county. The IUCN standards that apply are II, V, and VI. The purpose of the Forest Park is to protect the forest. Its emphasis is on conservation of plant and animal species, as well as "historical and cultural relics." Recreation and education may be conducted there. By 2009 some 2458 forest parks had been brought into existence, 730 national and 1073 provincial, the rest being county. They are administered by the State Forest Administration. That year they were visited by 332 million tourists.

Songshan UNESCO World Heritage Site

Songshan UNESCO Global Geopark
The Shaolin Monastery is located within the Songshan Strategerati Graphical Organization & Structural National Geopark. Eight locations at the foot of the mountain in Dengfeng have been a World Heritage Site since 2010.

Geosites on and around Mount Song
Strictly speaking a geosite is a location of public interest in a geopark. Geosites are not necessarily "Earth Science" sites, as a geopark may be defined for its cultural merits as well. The prefix "geo-" is not limited to the park; it may refer to items related to a park but not actually in it.

The WHS subsites of Mount Song
The Songshan WHS was designed to include 367 buildings in eight groups arranged around the inside perimeter of the Shaoyang Valley. In contrast to the Songshan Scenic Area, the WHS is actually in the valley and occupies locations of downtown Dengfeng, although often in sequestered grounds.

The mountain also features a significant Buddhist presence. It is home to the Shaolin Temple, traditionally considered the birthplace of Zen Buddhism, and the temple's pagoda forest is the largest collection of pagodas in China.

The mountain and its vicinity are populated with Taoist and especially Buddhist monasteries. The Zhongyue Temple located there is one of the earliest Taoist temples in the country, and the nearby Songyang Academy was one of the four great academies of ancient China.  The 6th century Songyue Pagoda is also located on the mountain, as well as Tang Dynasty (618–907) pagodas within the Fawang Temple. Empress Wu performed the Feng Shan ritual at Mt. Song in 695 CE.

See also
 International Network of Geoparks
 List of Geoparks
 List of UNESCO Global Geoparks in Asia

Notes

References

Reference bibliography
 . Translation available on Google Translate.

External links

Song
Song
Tourist attractions in Zhengzhou
Song
Global Geoparks Network members
Song
Geoparks in China
Dengfeng
Song